Antoni Lluís Adrover Colom (born 14 June 1982), known as Tuni, is a Spanish professional footballer who plays mainly as an attacking midfielder.

He amassed La Liga totals of 106 matches and four goals over seven seasons, all with Mallorca.

Club career
Born in Sóller, Majorca, Balearic Islands, Tuni made his professional debut with hometown RCD Mallorca's first team during the 2002–03 season, appearing in five games and scoring one goal. His first La Liga match came on 8 December 2002 in a 1–5 home loss against Real Madrid, and he would be loaned the following campaign to second division side UD Salamanca.

After four seasons in which his role was irregular (65 appearances from 2004 to 2006, 27 the following two), Tuni was loaned again, to second level's Hércules CF for the duration of 2008–09. Returned to Mallorca for the subsequent top flight campaign, he suffered a severe knee injury which limited his participation to just nine games out of 38.

In late January 2011, Tuni was loaned to Catalan club Gimnàstic de Tarragona on a six-month loan, and contributed with seven starts – 560 minutes in total – as the team narrowly avoided division two relegation. In July he became a free agent, and signed a permanent contract with Nàstic.

On 11 January 2013, Tuni signed for Iraklis 1908 Thessaloniki F.C. in Greece, joining several compatriots at the second division team.

References

External links

1982 births
Living people
People from Sóller
Spanish footballers
Footballers from Mallorca
Association football midfielders
La Liga players
Segunda División players
Segunda División B players
Tercera División players
RCD Mallorca B players
RCD Mallorca players
UD Salamanca players
Hércules CF players
Gimnàstic de Tarragona footballers
Football League (Greece) players
Iraklis Thessaloniki F.C. players
Spanish expatriate footballers
Expatriate footballers in Greece
Spanish expatriate sportspeople in Greece